Birdie Buddy is a South Korean television series set in the world of professional golf. Based on the 2007 comic series of the same title by Lee Hyun-sae, it starred Uee, Lee Yong-woo and Lee Da-hee.

The drama was pre-produced in 2010 (filmed completely before broadcast), and initially expected to air on MBC in December 2010, but the network decided not to give it a timeslot. After several postponements, it aired on cable channel tvN from August 8 to October 25, 2011 on Mondays and Tuesdays at 23:00 (KST). But instead of the original 20 episodes of 70 minutes each, it was re-edited into 24 episodes spanning 45 minutes each.

Synopsis
Sung Mi-soo (Uee) is a cheerful, humble country girl from Gangwon Province. She comes from a poor family, and her mother used to work as a caddie. With her bright personality and determined efforts, Mi-soo is striving to become a professional golf player.

On the other hand, Min Hae-ryung (Lee Da-hee) is an elite athlete who has been groomed for professional golf since a young age. Placed in the best environment to play golf, Hae-ryung's emotions are always controlled and she has a deep emotional wound inside of her.

These two girls from different backgrounds share the same dream of being the next top golfer, a dream that leads them to former pro golfer John Lee (Lee Yong-woo).

John Lee was the first Korean to win a PGA title. His background was a mystery other than the fact that he was an adoptee. Aside from golf, he also excelled in the Afro-Brazilian dance/martial arts style known as capoeira. But even though he found success by winning the PGA title, John Lee stopped playing golf to become a golf course tester. John Lee agrees to lead Mi-soo and Hae-ryung into becoming the next queens of golf like Se Ri Pak, Michelle Wie, Jiyai Shin, and Eun-Hee Ji.

Cast

Main
 Uee as Sung Mi-soo
 Jin Ji-hee as young Mi-soo
 Lee Yong-woo as John Lee
 Yoon Chan as young John
 Lee Da-hee as Min Hae-ryung

Supporting

Mi-soo’s family and friends
 Lee Byung-joon as Sung Kyung-hwan
 Yoon Yoo-sun as Jo Kyung-sook (Mi-soo's mother)
 Park Han-bi as Sung Tae-gab (Mi-soo's brother)
 Ahn Do-gyu as young Tae-gab
 Yoo In-na as Lee Gong-sook (Mi-soo's friend), in love with Tae-gab
 Gina as young Gong-sook
 Han Seung-hyun as Ahn Joong-ki

Hae-ryung’s family and friends
 Oh Hyun-kyung as Min Se-hwa (Hae-ryung's mother)
 Park Sung-woong as Choi Dong-kwan, Min Se-hwa's right-hand man and lover
 Kim Jong-jin as Woo Joon-mo, a skilled greens keeper who is Hae-ryung's long lost father
 Yang Hee-kyung as Uhm Jung-ran, a friend of both Kyung-sook and Se-hwa, who becomes the chief of caddies at Se-hwa's golf club

Others
 Choi Il-hwa as Jay Park, a wealthy and manipulative gambler
 Robert Holley as Yoon Kwang-baek, a former golf pro and now an eccentric recluse who takes on Mi-soo as his student
 Park Young-rin as Park Eun-joo, an energetic young reporter
 Yoon Gi-won as pro-golfer Wang
 Julien Kang as Gary Jung, a golfer hired by Jay Park to play Mi-soo in an unusual golf challenge
 Choo So-young, a scout
 Kim Jung-hak, one of Park's henchmen 
 Woo Hyun, a golf equipment maker and friend of John Lee
 Kim Dong-hyeon
 Samuel Kang, a reporter
 Gu Bon-im

References

External links
 
 

2011 South Korean television series debuts
2011 South Korean television series endings
Korean-language television shows
TVN (South Korean TV channel) television dramas
South Korean sports television series
South Korean romantic comedy television series
South Korean pre-produced television series